The Ladies’ Gallery is a memoir that tells the stories of three women: the author Irene Vilar, her mother Gladys Méndez, and her grandmother the Puerto Rican independence activist Lolita Lebrón.  The memoir was translated from the Spanish by Gregory Rabassa and has only been published in English.  It was first published by Pantheon Books in 1996  as A Message From God in the Atomic Age and then by Vintage in 1998 as The Ladies’ Gallery: A Memoir of Family Secrets. The work was nominated for the  1999 Mind Book of the Year Award.

Author
Irene Vilar was born in 1969 in Puerto Rico, where she spent much of her childhood.  She also attended schools in the United States and Spain before enrolling in Syracuse University in New York at the age of fifteen.  Vilar has also co-authored a children's book titled Sea Journal.  She currently works as an author, editor, and literary agent.  For biographical and professional information, see irenevilar.com

Summary
Vilar's narrative is circular and framed by her description of the time she spent in psychiatric hospitals following two attempted suicide attempts while a college student.  Vilar grew up in Puerto Rico with her parents and three older brothers.  Her mother Gladys committed suicide by jumping out of a moving car while eight-year-old Irene was sitting next to her.  Vilar mourned her mother's death and decided to attend school in the United States, where her aunt and uncle were working, and then in Spain, in the town where her paternal grandfather fled around the time of the Spanish Civil War.  As a college student in Syracuse, Vilar attempted suicide twice and spent time psychiatric wards.

Gladys Méndez, Vilar's mother, committed suicide when Vilar was eight years old.  Gladys's own mother left her to be raised by her grandparents so that she could go to the United States and work during the so-called “Great Migration” of people from the island of Puerto Rico during the mid-twentieth century.  Gladys only met her mother in person four times in her life, once when Gladys was eight and her mother came to leave a son in Puerto Rico, and three times while Lolita (Gladys's mother) was imprisoned.  Gladys married at fifteen, and her husband had affairs with other women throughout their marriage.  The couple had dramatic fights and reconciliations.  She became increasingly despondent and physically ill towards the end of her life.

Lolita Lebrón, Vilar's grandmother, led an armed attack on the United States House of Representatives on March 1, 1954.  She had been inspired by Puerto Rican nationalist leader Pedro Albizu Campos.  She, along with three male counterparts, sat in the visitor's area, called “The Ladies’ Gallery” and opened fire in the chamber.  Several congressmen were hurt, but no one was killed.  Due to a recent attack on President Truman's temporary residence, the nationalist activists were expecting to be killed themselves.  Lolita was sentenced to fifty-seven years in prison, of which she served twenty-seven until being pardoned by President Carter.

In addition to the women's stories as imagined by Vilar, the memoir includes historical information, interview segments, and reflections on issues from cultural identity to literature.  The memoir concludes with Vilar's release from the hospital and miscarriage, along with an epilogue and note.

Some themes
Repetition: The memoir revolves around themes of repetition.  Vilar says, “Repetition informs my life” (Vilar 4).  In this memoir, patterns are repeated generation after generation.
Abandonment:  “Someone goes and someone stays” (Vilar 66).  Whether through migration or suicide, abandonment and its aftermath are key issues in this text.
Motherhood:    By focusing on three generations of women, all of whom experience unplanned and/or unwanted pregnancy, this memoir explores the complexity of motherhood.  Vilar says, “A missing mother—and one of whom not even her photographs remain—is a problem” (Vilar 29).
Identity: This memoir explores the legacy of violence and history, both personal and political, in the individual's life.  It also examines the relationship between the United States and Puerto Rico and what this means for the identity of those with Puerto Rican origins.

Readings and interviews
Vilar reading an excerpt of The Ladies' Gallery on WGBH Boston .
Transcript of Ilan Stavans's interview with Vilar on WGBH Boston's La Plaza program .

Reviews and related articles
Ojito, Mirta.  “Shots That Haunted 3 Generations.”  The New York Times 26 May 1998.
Pérez Ortiz, Melanie A.  “Irene Vilar: Critique of Self-Sacrifice in the Puerto Rican Nationalist Party From the Forbidden Side of the Border."  Encrucijadas/Crossroads 1.1 (2003): 99-116.
Roig-Franzia, Manuel. "A Terrorist in the House." The Washington Post Magazine.  22 February 2004.
For a list of reviews of The Ladies' Gallery, see www.publishersmarketplace.com.

See also
Impossible Motherhood

References

1996 non-fiction books
Works by Irene Vilar
American memoirs